Pine Township is one of twelve townships in Warren County, Indiana, United States. According to the 2010 census, its population was 481 and it contained 213 housing units.

History
Pine Township was established in March 1830.  There were originally four townships in the county; Pine and Washington were the first two new townships to be created.

Van Reed Farmstead was listed on the National Register of Historic Places in 2015.

Geography
Its only town is Rainsville, though a tiny hamlet named Brisco once existed to its west. Other extinct towns include Hooker Corner, Point Pleasant and Rocky Ford. The streams of Mud Pine Creek, Spring Branch and Stoney Creek run through this township.

Cemeteries
The township contains these six cemeteries: Brisco, Gray, Hooker, Jones, Rainsville and Van Reed.

Transportation
U.S. Route 41 runs from north to south in the far western part of the township on its way to Attica.  Indiana State Road 26 winds its way across the north part of the township on its route from the Illinois state line to Pine Village.

Education
Pine Township is part of the Metropolitan School District of Warren County.

Government
Pine Township has a trustee who administers rural fire protection and ambulance service, provides relief to the poor, manages cemetery care, and performs farm assessment, among other duties. The trustee is assisted in these duties by a three-member township board. The trustees and board members are elected to four-year terms.

Pine Township is part of Indiana's 8th congressional district, Indiana House of Representatives District 42, and Indiana State Senate District 38.

References

 
 United States Census Bureau TIGER/Line Shapefiles

Bibliography

External links

Townships in Warren County, Indiana
Populated places established in 1830
Townships in Indiana
1830 establishments in Indiana